Alejandro Zorrilla de San Martín (1909–1987) was a Uruguayan political figure.

Background

He was a prominent member of the Uruguayan National (Blanco) Party. His grandfather was the poet and political figure Juan Zorrilla de San Martín.

Public offices

He was elected a Deputy in 1954 and served as President of the Chamber of Deputies of Uruguay from March 1, 1960, to March 1, 1961. From 1963 to 1965 he was Foreign Affairs Minister of Uruguay; thereafter he served as member of the National Council of Government of Uruguay.

From 1966 to 1973 he served as a Senator.

Ambassador-designate and death

He died in 1987, shortly after being designated Ambassador to the Vatican, but before he was able to take up his post.

See also
 Politics of Uruguay
 List of political families#Uruguay

References

Presidents of the Chamber of Representatives of Uruguay
Members of the Senate of Uruguay
Ambassadors of Uruguay to the Holy See
Foreign ministers of Uruguay
Presidents of the National Council of Government (Uruguay)
1909 births
1987 deaths
National Party (Uruguay) politicians